This is a list of Greek football transfers in the summer transfer window 2012 by club.

Superleague

AEK Athens FC

In:

Out:

Aris Thessaloniki FC

In:

Out:

Asteras Tripoli F.C.

In:

Out:

Atromitos F.C.

In:

Out:

Kerkyra F.C.

In:

Out:

 (from  Nea Salamis Famagusta FC)
 (from  Levadiakos F.C.)
 (from  FC Wohlen)
 (on loan from  Olympiacos)
 (from  Olympiacos)

 (to  Veria F.C.)
 (to  CD Guadalajara (Spain))
 (to  Mosta F.C.)
 (to  C.F. Os Belenenses)
 (to  VfL Bochum II)
 (Free Agent)
 (to  SV Elversberg)
 (Free Agent)
 (Free Agent)
 (Free Agent)
 (Free Agent)
 (to  Crewe Alexandra F.C.)
 (Free Agent)

Levadiakos

In:

Out:

OFI Crete

In:

Out:

Olympiacos F.C.

In:

Out:

Panathinaikos F.C.

In:

Out:

Panionios G.S.S.

In:

Out:

Panthrakikos F.C.

In:

Out:

PAOK F.C.

In:

Out:

PAS Giannina F.C.

In:

Out:

Platanias F.C.

In:

Out:

Skoda Xanthi F.C.

In:

Out:

Veria

In:

Out:

External links
 Contra.gr
 Sport24.gr
 Balleto.gr
 Gazzetta.gr

Greek
2012–13 in Greek football
2012